This is a list of graded music series. 

A graded music series is a set of instructional texts for teaching music.

Vocal Music Readers by Joseph Bird (Oliver Ditson Company, 1861) 
The Song Garden by Lowell Mason (Oliver Ditson Company, 1864)
First Steps in Music by George Loomis (1866)
The National Music Course by Luther Whiting Mason (Boston: Ginn, 1870)
The Elementary Music Reader by Benjamin Jepson (A. S. Barnes, 1871)
The Graded School Singer by Orlando Blackman and E. E. Whittemore (1873)
The Normal Music Course (D. Appleton and Company, 1883)
The Tonic Sol-Fa Music Course by Daniel Batchellor and Thomas Charmbury (Boston: Oliver Ditson & Co., 1884)
Public School Music Course by Charles E. Whiting (1889)
The Model Music Course by J. A. Broekhaven ad A. J. Gantvoort (1895)
The Natural Music Course by Thomas Tapper and Frederick Ripley (American Book Company, 1895)
Harmonic Course in Music by Thomas Tapper and Frederick Ripley (American Book Company, 1903)
Melodic Course in Music by Thomas Tapper and Frederick Ripley (American Book Company, 1905)

References

Mark, Michael L. and Charles L. Gary. A History of American Music Education. 3rd ed. Lanham: Rowman & Littlefield Education, 2007.

Music education in the United States
Music theory lists
Reference material lists